Simon Cottle may refer to:
 Simon Cottle (rower)
 Simon Cottle (writer)